Carol Wood is an American mathematician.

Carol Wood may also refer to:

Carol Wood (musician) for Eroica Classical Recordings
Carol Wood (writer), who co-wrote romance novels with Rita Bradshaw
Carol Wood, candidate in Milton Keynes Council election, 2002

See also
Carolwood, record company
Carrollwood, Florida
Coralwood, plants
Carol Woods (born 1943), actress